Mohamed Abdeltawwab Ibrahim Abdelbaki (born ) is an Egyptian male weightlifter, competing in the 69 kg category and representing Egypt at international competitions. He participated in Weightlifting at the 2008 Summer Olympics in the 62 kg division finishing eighth, with 288 kg, beating his previous personal best by 2 kg. He competed at world championships, most recently at the 2011 World Weightlifting Championships.

Major results

References

External links
 NBC profile

1987 births
Living people
Egyptian male weightlifters
Weightlifters at the 2008 Summer Olympics
Weightlifters at the 2012 Summer Olympics
Olympic weightlifters of Egypt
African Games gold medalists for Egypt
African Games medalists in weightlifting
African Games silver medalists for Egypt
Mediterranean Games silver medalists for Egypt
Mediterranean Games bronze medalists for Egypt
Mediterranean Games medalists in weightlifting
Competitors at the 2007 All-Africa Games
Competitors at the 2009 Mediterranean Games
21st-century Egyptian people